Japanese rock band Gacharic Spin have released seven full and two mini studio albums, two compilation albums, nine video albums and ten singles.

Studio albums

Mini albums

Singles

Compilation albums

Video albums

References 

Discographies of Japanese artists
Rock music group discographies